Gumerovo (Ğümär) is a rural locality (a village) in Ilikovsky Selsoviet, Blagoveshchensky District, Bashkortostan, Russia. The population was 59 as of 2010. In this village there is only one street.

Geography 
Gumerovo is located 50 km northeast of Blagoveshchensk (the district's administrative centre) by road. Staroilikovo is the nearest rural locality.

References 

Rural localities in Blagoveshchensky District